Al-Jazeera Sports Club is a Syrian football club currently playing in the Syrian Premier League. The club is based in the city of Al-Hasakah, and was founded in 1941.

Current squad

References

External links
  Official website
  Al-Jazeera at Kooora.com

Jazeera
Association football clubs established in 1941
Al-Hasakah
1941 establishments in Mandatory Syria